The 1980–81 Yale Bulldogs men's ice hockey team represented Yale University in the 1980–81 NCAA Division I men's ice hockey season. The team is coached by Tim Taylor, his fifth season behind the bench at Yale. The Bulldogs play their home games at Ingalls Rink on the campus of Yale University, competing in the ECAC.

The Bulldogs posted a regular season record of 13 wins, 12 losses, and 1 tie. Despite finishing 2nd in the Ivy Region of the ECAC Conference, Yale didn't qualify for the postseason.

Offseason

Five Senior Bulldogs graduated in May: Captain Gary Lawerence – F, Keith Allain – G, Steve Harrington – D, Wally Row – F, and Gavin Thurston – F

On June 11, forward Bob Brooke was drafted 75th overall by the St. Louis Blues in the 1980 NHL Entry Draft.

Senior defensemen Doug Tingey was named Captain for the 1980–81 season.

1980–81 Roster

Departures from 1979–1980 team
Gary Lawerence, F – Graduation
Keith Allain, G – Graduation
Steve Harrington, D – Graduation
Wally Row, F – Graduation
Gavin Thurston, F – Graduation

1980–81 Bulldogs

Coaches

Staff

Standings

Schedule

|-
!colspan=12 style="color:white; background:#00356B" | Exhibition

|-
!colspan=12 style="color:white; background:#00356B" | Regular Season

Statistics

References

Yale Bulldogs men's ice hockey seasons
Yale
Yale
1980 in sports in Connecticut
1981 in sports in Connecticut